Isabelle "Bella" Haak (born 11 July 1999) is a Swedish volleyball player, who plays as an opposite for the Italian club Imoco Volley Conegliano and the Swedish national team.

Club career
Haak started playing volleyball at the youth teams of her hometown club Engelholms VS and at the age of 14 made her debut for the first team in the Elitserien. She became part of the starting line-up of the team in the 2014/15 season and helped Engelholms VS win the Swedish Championship for two consecutive seasons. She was elected Player of the Year by the Swedish Volleyball Federation in both 2014/15 and 2015/16 seasons. In the early years of her career, Haak participated in beach volleyball as well as indoor volleyball. Together with her partner Fanny Åhman, she was fourth in the 2015 U18 European Championships in Riga.

After two successful seasons in Engelholm, Haak signed a contract with the French club Béziers VB for the 2016/17 season. With her new team, Haak reached the final at the French Cup where Béziers lost to Venelles 2–3 in a very closely contested match. She was the top scorer of the French League in the regular season, and voted the MVP and the best opposite spiker of the season. Despite finishing third in the regular season, Béziers were defeated by the defending champions sixth-seeded Saint-Raphaël at the first round of the playoffs. At the end of the season, Haak joined the Italian side Savino Del Bene Scandicci.

In her first season in Italy, Haak became the scoring champion of the league with 491 points, averaging the season's highest 6.14 points per set, and was selected for the All Star game while her team Scandicci finished the regular season in second place, just one point behind Igor Gorgonzola Novara. In the playoffs, Scandicci eliminated Volley Pesaro in the first round but lost to Imoco Volley Conegliano in the semifinals.

After two seasons in Italy, Haak joined VakıfBank S.K. in 2019 where she is currently playing.

International career
Haak made her international debut with the Swedish national volleyball team against Latvia on 10 May 2014 at the age of fourteen, and became the youngest ever volleyball player to represent Sweden at senior level. She was the member of the Swedish U19 teams that won the U19 NEVZA (North European Volleyball Zonal Association) Championships in 2014 and 2015.

Personal life
Haak was born in Perstorp but she later moved to Ängelholm shortly after her father had passed away from stomach cancer when she was 9 years old. Her older sister Anna is also a national volleyball player and was her teammate during her time in Engelholms VS.

Awards

Individuals
 2014–15 Elitserien "Player of the Year"
 2014–15 Elitserien "Top Scorer"
 2015–16 Elitserien "Player of the Year"
 2015–16 Elitserien "Top Scorer"
 2016–17 Ligue A Fémminine "Most Valuable Player"
 2016–17 Ligue A Fémminine "Best Opposite Spiker"
 2016–17 Ligue A Fémminine "Top Scorer"
 2017–18 Lega Pallavolo Serie A Femminile "Top Scorer"
 2019 FIVB Club World Championship "Best Opposite"
 2020–21 Turkish League "Most Valuable Player"
 2020–21 CEV Champions League "Top Scorer"
 2021 FIVB Club World Championship "Best Opposite"
 2021 FIVB Club World Championship "Most Valuable Player"
 2021–22 Turkish Women's Volleyball Cup "Most Valuable Player"
 2021–22 Turkish League "Best Opposite"
 2021–22 CEV Champions League "Top Scorer"
 2021–22 Best Female Volleyball Player of the Year by CEV
 2022 FIVB Volleyball Women's Club World Championship "Most Valuable Player"
 2022 FIVB Volleyball Women's Club World Championship "Best Opposite Spiker"

Clubs
 2014–15 Elitserien –  Champion, with Engelholms VS
 2015–16 Elitserien –  Champion, with Engelholms VS
 2016–17 Coupe de France –  Runner-Up, with Béziers VB
 2019 Turkish Super Cup –  Runner-Up, with VakıfBank S.K.
 2019 FIVB Club World Championship –  Bronze medal, with VakıfBank S.K.
 2020 Turkish Super Cup –  Runner-Up, with VakıfBank S.K.
 2020–21 Turkish League –  Champion, with VakıfBank S.K.
 2020–21 CEV Champions League –  Runner-Up, with Vakıfbank S.K.
 2021 Turkish Super Cup –  Champion, with VakıfBank S.K.
 2021 FIVB Club World Championship –  Champion, with VakıfBank S.K.
 2021–22 Turkish Women's Volleyball Cup –  Champion, with VakıfBank S.K.
 2021–22 Turkish League –  Champion, with VakıfBank S.K.
 2021–22 CEV Champions League –  Champion, with Vakıfbank S.K.
 2022 FIVB Volleyball Women's Club World Championship Champion, with Imoco Volley

National team

Junior team
 2014 U19 NEVZA Championship –  Gold Medal
 2015 U19 NEVZA Championship –  Gold Medal

Senior team
 2018 Women's Silver European Volleyball League –  Gold Medal

References

1999 births
Living people
Swedish  women's volleyball players
Swedish expatriate sportspeople in France
Swedish expatriate sportspeople in Italy
Swedish expatriate sportspeople in Turkey
VakıfBank S.K. volleyballers
People from Perstorp Municipality
Sportspeople from Skåne County